Claude Ventura (born 4 July 1938) is a French film director.

Biography 
He collaborates to television shows as Italics, Cinéma, Cinémas, Panorama, La saga des Français, Bande à part, Un jour futur, Lancelot and a musical portrait of Liverpool in 1974. He was engaged with Gaëlle Royer for ten years, the mother of Emma de Caunes.

Filmography 
Television
 1968-1970 : Tous en scène
 1973 : Italics
 1974 : Extraits du journal de J.-H. Lartigue
 1970-1974 : Pop2
 1975 : John Lewis
 1982-1991 : Cinema Cinemas, magazine TV
 1982 : Chorus
 1981 : Sonny Rollins
 1995 : Hank Williams, Vie et mot d'un cadillac cow-boy
 1995 : Johnny Hallyday, All Access
 1998 : Eddy Mitchell
 1998 : Francis Scott Fitzgerald, Retour à Babylone
 1999 : Gina, Sophia et moi
 2002 : La Femme de papier
 2005 : Guy Peellaert, l’art et la manière
 2006 : Jacques Monory
Documentary
 1993 : Chambre 12, Hôtel de Suède, on the set of À bout de souffle
 1988 : À la recherche de la couleur perdue
 2013 : Les Garçons de Rollin,  85 min
 2016 : Fitzgerald - Hemingway, une question de taille, serie Duels
Cinéma
 2000 : En quête des Sœurs Papin

Bibliography 
La télévision des Trente Glorieuses: Culture et politique, d'Avner Ben-Amos, 2013

References

External links 
 

1938 births
Living people
French film directors